The FIS Alpine World Ski Championships 1934 in alpine skiing were the fourth edition of the competition, organized by the International Ski Federation (FIS) and held at Piz Nair in St. Moritz, Switzerland in February 1934.

Medal summary

Men's events

Women's events

Medal table

References

1934 in alpine skiing
1934 in Swiss sport
1934
Sport in St. Moritz
International sports competitions hosted by Switzerland
Alpine skiing competitions in Switzerland
February 1934 sports events